The fifth season of Criminal Minds premiered on CBS on September 23, 2009 and ended May 26, 2010. Episode 18 was a pilot episode for the spin-off series Criminal Minds: Suspect Behavior.

Cast

Main 
 Joe Mantegna as Supervisory Special Agent David Rossi (BAU Senior Agent)
 Paget Brewster as Supervisory Special Agent Emily Prentiss (BAU Agent)
 Shemar Moore as Supervisory Special Agent Derek Morgan (BAU Agent/Acting Unit Chief)
 Matthew Gray Gubler as Supervisory Special Agent Dr. Spencer Reid (BAU Agent)
 A. J. Cook as Supervisory Special Agent Jennifer "JJ" Jareau (BAU Communications Liaison)
 Kirsten Vangsness as Special Agent Penelope Garcia (BAU Technical Analyst)
 Thomas Gibson as Supervisory Special Agent Aaron "Hotch" Hotchner (BAU Unit Chief/Agent)

Special guest stars 
 Forest Whitaker as Supervisory Special Agent Sam Cooper (BAU Red Cell Team Leader)
 Michael Kelly as Supervisory Special Agent Jonathan "Prophet" Simms
 Matt Ryan as Supervisory Special Agent Mick Rawson
 Beau Garrett as Supervisory Special Agent Gina LaSalle
 Tim Curry as the "Prince of Darkness"

Recurring 
 Jayne Atkinson as Supervisory Special Agent Erin Strauss (BAU Section Chief)
 Cade Owens as Jack Hotchner
 Nicholas Brendon as Kevin Lynch
 Meredith Monroe as Haley Hotchner
 Josh Stewart as William "Will" LaMontagne Jr.
 Mekhai Andersen as Henry LaMontagne

Guest 
 David Eigenberg as FBI Special Agent Russell Goldman (Episode 14)

Guest stars 

In the season premiere "Nameless, Faceless", D. B. Sweeney guest-starred as Sam Kassmeyer, a U.S. Marshal who is assigned to protect Aaron Hotchner's family until George Foyet is caught. Christopher Cousins guest-starred as Dr. Tom Barton, a trauma surgeon whose son is targeted by the father of a teenage boy Barton tried to save. In the episode "Haunted", Sean Patrick Flanery guest-starred as Darrin Call, a spree killer who has never forgotten the day his father's last victim escaped. Glenn Morshower guest-starred as Lieutenant Kevin Mitchell, who leads the investigation of the shooting. Michael Bowen guest-starred as Tommy Phillips, the lone survivor of Darrin's father Bill Jarvis, a.k.a. "The Hollow Creek Killer", played by Don Creech. In the episode "Reckoner", Lawrence Pressman guest-starred as Boyd Schuller, a terminally ill court judge who hires Tony Mecacci to commit a series of vigilante murders. 

In the episode "Hopeless", Clayne Crawford and Blake Shields guest-starred as C. Vincent and J.R. Baker, a gang of thrill killers known as "Turner's Group." Wade Williams guest-starred as Detective Andrews, who leads the investigation of the murders. In the episode "Cradle to Grave", Mae Whitman and Hallee Hirsh guest-starred as Julie and Carol, two women who are abducted by a married couple, who are unable to have children due to the wife dying from breast cancer. In the episode "The Performer", Gavin Rossdale guest-starred as Paul "Dante" Davies, a famous rock musician who is suspected of murdering several of his fans. Eddie Jemison guest-starred as Paul's manager, Ray Campion, who is responsible for the murders, as was his accomplice, Gina King, played by Inbar Lavi. In the episode "Outfoxed", Neal Jones reprises as Karl Arnold, a.k.a. "The Fox", where he is interviewed by Hotch and Prentiss, who are investigating someone who is copying Arnold's murders. 

In the episode "The Slave of Duty", Wes Brown guest-starred as Joe Belser, a.k.a. "The Nashville Stalker", a misogynistic serial killer and Khary Payton guest-starred as Detective Landon Kaminski, who leads the investigation of the murders. In the episode "Retaliation", Lee Tergesen guest-starred as Dale Schrader, a serial killer who escapes police custody and abducts the family of his former accomplice. In the episode "The Uncanny Valley", Jonathan Frakes guest-starred as Dr. Arthur Malcolm, a pedophile who molested his daughter, Samantha, and gave her porcelain dolls away to another girl. Rosalie Ward guest-starred as Bethany Wallace, a woman who is abducted by Samantha Malcolm. In the episode "Risky Business", John Pyper-Ferguson guest-starred as Wilson Summers, a father who created a viral internet game that convinces young teenagers to commit suicide. 

In the episode "Parasite", Victor Webster guest-starred as Bill Hodges, a serial killer who has a wife and two other lovers. Annabeth Gish guest-starred as Bill's wife, Rebecca, and Valerie Cruz guest-starred as Bill's secret lover, Brooke Sanchez. In the episode "Public Enemy", Sprague Grayden guest-starred as Meg Collins, a religious mother and wife whose husband is murdered by Connor O'Brien, a spree killer who murders people simply to generate fear among the public. In the episode "Mosley Lane", Bud Cort and Beth Grant guest-starred as Roger and Anita Roycewood, a married couple who abduct children and cremate their remains after sedating them. Ann Cusack guest-starred as Sarah Hillridge, an alcoholic mother and wife whose son has been missing for eight years, and Brooke Smith guest-starred as Barbara Lynch, a mother and wife whose daughter, Aimee, is abducted by the Roycewoods. 

In the episode "Solitary Man", Morgan Lily guest-starred as Jody Hatchett, a young girl whose father, Wade, abducts mothers for Jody and would later tell her about his escapades as fairytales. Gabrielle Carteris guest-starred as Nancy Campbell, the last victim whom Wade abducts. In the episode "The Fight", Alexa Nikolas guest-starred as Jane McBride, a teenage girl who is abducted by John Vincent Bell, along with her father, Ben. Lesley Fera guest-starred as Leslie McBride. In the episode "A Rite of Passage", Mike Doyle guest-starred as Deputy Ronald Boyd, a serial killer who is targeting illegal immigrants trying to cross the U.S. border. Marlene Forte guest-starred as Sheriff Eva Ruiz, who aids the BAU with the investigation of the murders until Ronald murders her. In the episode "A Thousand Words", Jolene Andersen guest-starred as Juliet Monroe, a pregnant widow who has been abducting women for several years until she dies giving birth to her son. 

In the episode "Exit Wounds", Mark L. Young guest-starred as Owen Porter, a serial killer and, at one point, a cannibal, from an abusive family. Eric Ladin guest-starred as Joshua Beardsley, a man who seeks vengeance against Porter for murdering his mother Carol, played by Dale Dickey. In the episode "The Internet is Forever", Ned Schmidtke guest-starred as Austin Chapman, the criminal accomplice of Robert Johnson, a.k.a. "The Internet Killer." In the season finale "Our Darkest Hour", Tim Curry guest-starred as one of the series most notorious criminals, Billy Flynn, a.k.a. "The Prince of Darkness", a serial killer who murders all but one victim. Eric Close guest-starred as Matt Spicer, a police detective leading the Prince of Darkness case, Robert Davi guest-starred as Spicer's partner, Detective Adam Kurzbard, and Linda Purl guest-starred as Colleen Everson, a woman who, after Billy Flynn raped her and murdered her husband, attempted suicide twice.

Episodes

Home media

References

External links

Criminal Minds
2009 American television seasons
2010 American television seasons